People's Choice or The People's Choice may refer to:

Awards 
People's Choice Awards, an American awards show
People's Choice Awards (Australia), an Australian version of the awards show
People's Choice Podcast Awards, an award given to podcasters
New Zealand Music People's Choice Award, awarded at the New Zealand Music Awards

Literature 
The People's Choice (novel), a 1995 novel by Jeff Greenfield
The People's Choice (history book), a book by Herbert Agar which won the Pulitzer Prize for History in 1934
 "The People's Choice" (story), a 1932 short story by Erskine Caldwell included in We Are the Living
The People's Choice, a book by American sociologist Paul Lazarsfeld

Music 
People's Choice (album), a 2004 album by Sledgeback
The People's Choice (album), an album by NoMeansNo
The People's Choice (band), a 1970s funk band
The People's Choice: Music, an "experimental" music project that produced "The Most Wanted Song" and "The Most Unwanted Song" on CD

Other 
Dixie Walker (1910–1982), American baseball player nicknamed "The People's Choice"
People's Choice Party, a political party in New Zealand
The People's Choice (TV series), a 1950s sitcom starring Jackie Cooper
People's Choice, series of paintings statistically derived by polling populations of various countries, see: Komar and Melamid#People's Choice
The People's Choice (political ticket), a political ticket that contests elections in Christchurch, New Zealand